Pierrot Lunaire is a Canadian/German film, which premiered at the 2014 Berlin Film Festival.

Written and directed by Bruce LaBruce as an adaptation of Arnold Schoenberg's Pierrot Lunaire, the film adds a transgender interpretation to the work, starring Susanne Sachsse as a trans man Pierrot. The film originated as a theatrical production of Pierrot Lunaire, which LaBruce directed for Berlin's Hebbel am Ufer theatre in 2011.

The costumes were designed by Zaldy.

The film won a Jury Award from the 2014 Teddy Award jury.

References

External links

2014 films
Canadian LGBT-related short films
LGBT-related drama films
2014 LGBT-related films
German LGBT-related films
German musical drama films
Films directed by Bruce LaBruce
LGBT-related musical films
Canadian musical drama films
Films about trans men
2010s musical drama films
2014 drama films
2010s Canadian films
2010s German films